The Films Act 1980 is an act of the Parliament of the United Kingdom. The act allowed the National Film Finance Corporation to exercise its powers in relation to financing the production of films for an extended period, gave further funding to the Corporation and amended the laws around the quotas of British films.

Provisions
The provisions of the act include:

Section 1
Extending the functions of the National Film Finance Corporation to the end of 1985 by amending the Films Act 1970, the Cinematograph Film Production (Special Loans) Act 1949 and the Cinematograph Films Act 1957 (which allowed the Corporation to make loans to film makers up to the end of 1980).

Section 2
Revoking Section 4 of the Cinematograph Film Production (Special Loans) Act 1949 which authorised government lending to the Corporation up until the end of 1980.

Making provisions for a £1 million government grant to be made available to the Corporation.

Limiting the Corporation's government borrowing to no more than £5 million.

Making it the duty of the British Film Fund Agency to collect the 'Eady Levy'.

Section 3
Amending Section 1(2) of the Cinematograph Film Production (Special Loans) Act 1949 to increase the number of directors from five to six.

Section 4
Amending Section 2 of the Cinematograph Films Act 1957 in respect of levies on exhibitors.

Section 5
Amending Section 1 of the Films Act 1960, extending the obligation of exhibitors to meet a quota of British or Community films among those that are shown to the end of 1985.

Section 6
Amending section 3 of the Films Act 1960 to change the quota requirements.

Section 7
Giving the Secretary of State the powers to suspend quota requirements.

Section 8
Amending section 17 of the Films Act 1960 to change the requirements needed to qualify as a British film.

Schedule
Repealing of whole of the Cinematograph Film Production (Special Loans) Act 1952 and the Cinematograph Films Act 1975.

Repeal
The Films Act 1980 was repealed by the Films Act 1985.

References

United Kingdom Acts of Parliament 1980
1980 in British cinema